Rangat is a town on the Middle Andaman Island, Andaman Archipelago. It is also one of the three counties (tehsils) administrative divisions of the North and Middle Andaman district, in the Andaman and Nicobar Islands union territory of India.  Its population, according to the 2001 Census of India, was 38,824 people, mainly of Bengalis and Tamils.

Rangat is 210 km from Port Blair and 70 km south of Mayabunder.  The town is well connected by road and sea routes.

Tourism
The town has been described as a "ramshackle sprawl around two rows of chai shops and general stores divided by the ATR Andaman Trunk Road." Some nearby tourist attractions are Amkunj Beach (8 km away) Dhani Nallah located at out skirts of Rangat and Cutbert Bay Beach (18 km away). The latter is an important turtle nesting ground, especially from December to February.

Villages
As of July 2012, Rangat county included the following villages (panchayats):
 Rangat proper
 Bakultala
 Dashratpur
 Kadamtala
 Kausalyanagar
 Long Island
 Nilambur
 Nimbutala
 Parnasala
 Sabri
 Shivapuram
 Sunderghar
 Urmilapur
 Uttara

Jawahar Navodaya Vidyalaya
Centrally funded Jawahar Navodaya Vidyalaya, Middle Andaman for North and Middle Andaman district is located in Rangat taluk. Navodaya vidyalaya is well connected via National Highway 4 which lies just 1.5 km away.

References

External links 
 Andaman & Nicobar Administration Web site
 North and Middle Administration Website
 Official Andaman & Nicobar Tourism Website
 

Cities and towns in North and Middle Andaman district